Masan is a mountain in the county of Goseong, Gangwon-do in South Korea.

See also
 List of mountains in Korea

Notes

References
 

Mountains of Gangwon Province, South Korea
Goseong County, Gangwon
Mountains of South Korea
One-thousanders of South Korea